Hunter Parrish Tharp (born May 13, 1987) is an American actor and singer. He is known for playing the role of Silas Botwin in the Showtime series Weeds and for his performances in the Broadway productions of Godspell in the role of Jesus and Spring Awakening as Melchior.

Early life
Parrish was born in Richmond, Virginia, to Annie Parrish, who works with children with autism, and Bruce Tharp, an engineer. Parrish has an older brother. He graduated from Plano Senior High School and Texas Tech University Independent School District.

Career

2003–2005: Early career 
After being seen at a showcase in New York, directed by Peter Sklar, Parrish was offered professional representation and went on to guest star in several television shows and appeared in the film Sleepover (2004).

2005–2012: Weeds and Broadway debut 
Parrish gained recognition when he began starring in the hit Showtime series Weeds in 2005. The show ran for eight seasons, ending in 2012. Part of the main ensemble cast, Parrish portrayed the role of the older Botwin son, Silas.

Following filming of Weeds fourth season, Parrish joined the cast of the Tony Award-winning Broadway musical Spring Awakening the Eugene O'Neill Theatre in New York City. He made his Broadway debut on August 11, 2008, replacement for the lead role of Melchior Gabor for which he received critical acclaim. He remained in the role until the show closed on January 18, 2009. Parrish returned to Broadway two-and-a-half years later, to star in the 2011 Broadway revival of Godspell in which he starred as Jesus. Performances began October 13, 2011. He left the show on April 15, 2012, to film the final season of Weeds.

During this period, Parrish had many other roles on screen. He has supporting parts in the films RV (2006), Freedom Writers (2007), and 17 Again (2009), and It's Complicated (2009).  In Freedom Writers, Parrish played Ben Samuels, the only white student in a California high school class. The National Review Online wrote that Parrish had played the role with "unassuming humour". He had a handful of guest role on TV and took part in the 2008 short "Cougar 101 with Hunter Parrish" for funnyordie.com. From 2007 to 2009, he hosted a web talk show with his friends Kyle Sherman and Allison Tyler called Two Guys and a Girl.

2012–present: Dramatic roles in television and film 
Since 2013, Parrish has had a string of recurring roles on television. In 2013 and 2014, he guest starred on The Good Wife as Jeffrey Grant, a young man accused of murder. In 2015, he also had recurring roles in The Following and Hand of God. Parrish had a main role in the Amazon series Good Girls Revolt, which was released in 2016. In 2017, Parrish was cast in the recurring role of Clay Haas in the second season of ABC's thriller series Quantico.

In March 2019, it was announced that Parrish would have one of the lead roles in the Jane The Virgin spin-off series Jane The Novela. Ultimately, the show was not picked up by The CW.

Earlier, in January 2019, it was announced that Parrish be part of the upcoming Netflix drama series Ratched. Produced by Ryan Murphy, Ratched scored a two-season, straight-to-series order, with the first season filmed from January into July 2019. The first season is set to be released on September 18, 2020.

Personal life
In December 2014, he announced his engagement to Kathryn Wahl. On September 13, 2015, they were married at the Flying Caballos Ranch, in San Luis Obispo, California. They welcomed their first child, a daughter, in September 2020.

Parrish is a Christian.

Filmography

Film

Television

Stage

Discography
In 2012, Parrish recorded his first EP called Guessing Games, featuring six songs. At first, Guessing Games was only available for sale in the lobby of Godspell’s home at the Circle in the Square Theatre, but with a bigger release to follow. The first single from the EP, "Sitting at Home", was released on iTunes on June 7, 2012. The complete EP was released later that month, on June 26.

Awards and nominations

References

External links

 
 

1987 births
21st-century American male actors
21st-century American singers
American male film actors
American male musical theatre actors
American male television actors
Living people
Male actors from Texas
People from Plano, Texas
Singers from Texas
Texas Tech University alumni
21st-century American male singers
American Christians